VVO may refer to:

 An abbreviation for the Verkehrsverbund Oberelbe, a public transport association for the area around Dresden in Germany
 The IATA code for Vladivostok International Airport in Russia
 The VVO astronomical catalog
 The Vaterländischer Verdienstorden, the Patriotic Order of Merit, an award in the former East Germany
 Vesiculo-vacuolar organelle, a structure in endothelial cells
 VVO Group, former name of Kojamo, a Finnish real estate investment company